The Brighton and Shoreham Tramway operated a tramway service in Shoreham between 1884 and 1913.

History

The Brighton and Shoreham Tramway ran from a terminus in Southdown Road, Shoreham to Westbourne Villas in Hove, on the former boundary between Hove and Portslade.  It never penetrated Hove, although a connecting horse-bus (route 112, operated by the Brighton and Preston United Omnibus Company) was available from the Westbourne Villas terminus.

Construction started in 1883 and route was opened throughout on 3 July 1884, initially with steam-driven trams.  After this proved unsuccessful, other methods of propulsion were tried (including, in 1887, an early battery-powered locomotive). In 1893 these were abandoned in favour of horses.

Closure

The British Electric Traction company took over the operations in 1898, but was unable to agree with any of the local authorities on a strategy for electrification.  The tramway closed in June 1913.

References

Tram transport in England
3 ft 6 in gauge railways in England